A liripipe is an element of clothing, the tail of a hood or cloak, or a long-tailed hood. The modern-day liripipe appears on the hoods of academic dress.

Description
With long-tailed hoods it includes in particular a chaperon or gugel, or the peak of a shoe. A graffito on the church wall of Swannington Church in Norfolk depicts a "late medieval woman wearing a long, laced gown and hood with a long liripipe ornament."

In modern times, liripipe mostly refers to the tail of the cowl of an academic hood, seen at graduation ceremonies.

Liripipe was popular from the mid-14th to the end of the 15th century. 'Liripipe', and the phrase 'liripipe hood', which are often used by costume historians, are not medieval words but scholarly adoptions dating to the early modern period to describe a fashion which appears very often in medieval art, in the form of a long extension to a hood. It could be worn hanging down, or, by the 15th century, is depicted wrapped round the head or the neck.

Origins
The word is believed to originate from the Medieval Latin term , which is of unsure origin. The Oxford English Dictionary, attributing the hypothesis to Gilles Ménage, calls it a "ludicrous guess".

Perhaps due to its academic association, the word has the obsolete sense of "part or lesson committed to memory", as in the expressions "to know one's liripipe" and "to teach someone his liripipe".

Another possible origin for the word is that it refers to the resemblance of the hood's "tail" to a long, thin purse used to hold coins, literally a "lira pipe".

Fashion 
Liripipe often appears in text as implicit criticism of absurd or exaggerated fashion: in the 1360s the author of the Chronicle Eulogium Historiarum sive Temporis mentions liripipes that hang right down to the heels like ridiculous strips ('liripipia usque talum longa modo fatuorum dilacerata') or worn tied round the head by cross-dressing women.

The term was also applied to exaggerated toes on shoes, according to a 14th-century statute of Oxford University.

Other uses
The variant spelling liripoop has also the obsolete meaning of "silly person", most probably because it is an inherently funny word, cf. "Nincompoop".

See also
Academic dress, for more information on hoods.
Chaperon (headgear)

Notes

References

External links
"Liripipe" by Michael Quinion
List of Favourite Words, Including "Liripipe" by Stephen Chrisomalis

Academic dress
Hats
History of clothing (Western fashion)
Parts of clothing